Makan 33 is an Israeli Arabic-language free-to-air television channel aimed at the country's Arab community, on behalf of the Israel Broadcasting Corporation. The channel was launched in May 2017 and replaced Channel 33, which preceded it.

References

External links

 

Arab culture in Jerusalem
Arabic-language mass media in Israel
Television channels and stations established in 2017
Television channels in Israel
2017 establishments in Israel